Surisan (수리산) is a mountain that forms a boundary between the cities of Anyang and Gunpo in Gyeonggi-do province, Korea. Another name for Surisan is GyeonBulSan.

Several Korean Buddhist temples are located on Surisan mountain and the surrounding area. In spring, the mountain is covered in azaleas in bloom. Surisan was designated a Park of Gyeonggi by Gyeonggi-do province in 2009.

Geography 
One of the mountainous regions that make up the Gwang-ju Mountain Range, it is situated in Gyeonggi-Province and lies between Anyang City and, to the southeast, Gunpo City.

The mountain has several prominent peaks: in the northwest, Gwan-Mo peak at  a.s.l.; in the southwest, Seul-Gi peak at  a.s.l., and Su-Am peak at  a.s.l. Tae-Eul peak, at  a.s.l., is in the centre. The highest of Surisan's peaks, Tae-Eul, is named for the shadow it casts at sunrise, which resembles a large eagle with spread wings. This can be seen from above when the peak is climbed. The appearance in nature of this eagle shape, called tae-eul, is considered a very rare phenomenon in feng shui theory.

The dominant rock-type of Surisan's peaks and cliffs is quartz. The deep valleys feature weathered biotite, biotite schist, horny gneiss and other gneissic rocks. Surisan has many natural mineral springs.

Surisan is characterized by its cover of flowering azaleas in the spring, when climbers gather to admire the reddish hues and rocky landscape. In its upper reaches, the vegetation is deciduous broadleaf forest, with oak and Mongolian mulberry predominating. The area has relatively few mammal species, and their populations are small. Surisan has a mole species, rabbits, wild boar, raccoon dogs, and weasels.

Among Surisan's temples are Sangyeon-sa (Sang-Yeon Temple), Yongjin-sa (Yong-Jin Temple), and Suri-sa (Suri Temple).

Etymology 
There are three theories as to the origin of the name Surisan:

1. The name may derive from the fact that the mountain's notable peaks resemble an eagle

2. The Suri temple was built during the reign of King Jinheung of Silla. It was called Suri-sa because it was a holy place for the body and mind, and gave its name to the mountain, SuriSan.

3. During the Joseon dynasty, Lee, son of the Joseon king, trained on this mountain. In honor of this, su (training) and Lee were combined, giving Surisan.

History

Joseon dynasty 

Surisan was well known during the Joseon dynasty (1392–1897). It is mentioned in the passage on the city of Ansan in Sejong Sillok Jiriji (King Sejong's Treatise on Geography), which states: "this mountain is called Chi San". The Joseon dynasty text SinJung DongGukYeoJiSeongRam refers to the mountain in its passage on Ansan as "...Surisan, which is also called GyunBulSan". The passage on the city of Gwacheon in the same book specifies that Surisan is said to be located in the southern part of Gwacheon. Surisan is also mentioned in the Ansan section of the text DaeDdongJiJi, compiled by 19th century Joseon dynasty geographer and cartographer Gim Jeong-ho: "in the east 5th, also called TaeEulSan and GyunBulSan, this mountain is quite tough and high."

Battle of Surisan 

The battle of Surisan took place during the Korean War in Surisan, northwestern Suwon, from February 1 to February 2, 1951. The United States First Corps attempted to advance into the south of the Han River area by launching a counterattack operation on January 25, 1951. At this time, the 35th Regiment of the U.S. 25th Infantry Division and the Turkish Brigade attacked and repelled the 149th Division of the 50th Army of the Chinese Communist Forces (CCF), which was defending its occupation of Surisan. The 35th Regiment and the Turkish Brigade were supported in battle by the United States 999th Armored Field Artillery Battalion and the U.S. 89th Medium Tank Battalion, surrounding the Surat Mountains on both sides and attacking the base of the Chinese 149th Division, and winning back the occupied territory. They then successfully defeated the Chinese Army counterattack, launched immediately afterwards. As a result of this battle, the Chinese army withdrew from the Suwon area, retreating north to Anyang. The United Nations Forces were subsequently able to continue northward to secure the Han River line.

Folktale

Yellow Rock Tale 

Yellow rock is a rock on Gwan-Mo peak which forms the upper part of SanSinJe Temple. Once upon a time there was a king, who was worried that there had been no prince to inherit the throne for over 40 years. God answered the diligent prayers of the court were answered, and a prince was born. When war broke out the year the prince turned three, he was taken from the palace to GangHwaDo to be safe. But on the way he encountered a storm, and the boat in which he travelled was shipwrecked. A turtle appeared and carried the prince to land, arriving at the edge of GwanMo Peak to look for shelter. After days on the turtle's back, the prince was starving and a pitiful sight. And so the turtle went down to the village in search of food for him. But the prince, unaware of the turtle's intention, thought that he was abandoned. In anger, the prince hit a rock as hard as he could with his fist. The boulder fell, striking the prince with a great sound that shook the heavens and the earth. The prince died, his blood spilling yellow, and the turtle was hit by a hail of falling rock. Thereafter, the story was told that Yellow Rock takes its name from the prince's blood from which it formed, and in a village of Anyang City stands a rock with a monument, called Turtle Rock.

Sport

Mountain biking 
Surisan is popular with mountain bike riders and has a number of bike trails, accessible from the nearby Line 4 train. One typical trail passes by the Gunpo Central Library, climbing some 200 meters to the temple entrance. The 11 km course can be completed in about two hours. It is one of the easiest mountain biking trails in the metropolitan area, in terms of slope, area, view, and ground condition. There is also a ridge trail running from the five-way intersection to the southeast, and a road descending from the same intersection. Roads on the mountain are generally not well-suited to biking, being narrow except at a few entry and exit points.

The trail running up through the bottleneck from the Anyang side is steep and the surface is poor, making it not practicable for regular cross-country bikes. The trail leading to Sukbong-Jangmobong is not suitable for biking and is for walkers only.

Hiking and climbing 

Most of Surisan's mountain-climbing trails overlap with mountain biking trails. Novice hikers and local residents often use the walking trails, which have rest benches installed along the way. Hikers must take their own water supplies, as water is only available in small quantities outside the summer season from one local shop, and there are no refreshment stalls on the mountain. At the bottom of the mountain, there is a freshwater spring at the entrance to the library, and Banwol reservoir lies to the southwest.

Recent

Forest exploration class 

The Surisan Forest Exploratory Class, established in 2017, is an Anyang City representative village community activation program. In May 2018, Anyang City selected the Surisan Forest Exploratory Class as a specialization subject and example of best practice for its Urban Renewal New Deal project. Anyang City invites a specialist forest explorer who guides participating school children's exploration of the mangrove forests. Participants engage in forest activities while listening to detailed explanations of the surrounding vegetation.

Atopy forest experience class 

An Atopic Forest Experience Class was held in the Surisan Forest Park on November 6, 2017, with 50 children and parents participating. This event took place after participants had completed the first of two months of theoretical training in understanding and managing atopic dermatitis and allergic rhinitis. Participants interacted with nature in the forests of Surisan Forest, experiencing the forest under the guidance of their forest guide. They also boosted immunity using the antimicrobial properties of forest-sourced phytoncide compounds. The Sanbon Health Center, which also covers Surisan, operates 43 inpatient and asthma relief facilities in the region and provides preventive management education and health care throughout the year, creating a healthy learning environment for children.

References

Korea Tourism
Surisan station

Mountains of Gyeonggi Province